The Quinnipiac Bobcats represent Quinnipiac University in ECAC Hockey. The Bobcats will attempt to qualify for the NCAA tournament for the first time in school history. The Bobcats will compete in the Nutmeg Classic on November 25 and 26.

Offseason
August 3: Head coach Rick Seeley has announced that Cassie Turner has been promoted to associate head coach. Turner joined the coaching staff in 2008.
August 17: Paul Nemetz-Carlson returns to Quinnipiac as an assistant coach. Previously, he served as an assistant coach during the team’s inaugural 2001–02 season. From 2008 to 2011, he was the assistant coach at Yale.

Recruiting

Exhibition

Regular season
October 1: In a match versus No. 8 nationally ranked Mercyhurst, Quinnipiac goaltender Victoria Vigilanti made 24 saves in a 1–0 shutout victory. It was the Bobcats first victory over Mercyhurst in twelve matches.
The Bobcats will compete in the Nutmeg Classic on November 25 and 26.
November 4:  Captain Jordan Elkins registered her third goal in as many games in a 3–0 victory over ECAC opponent Yale. Goaltender Victoria Vigilanti netted her third shutout of the season. With the triumph, the Bobcats extend their undefeated record in ECAC conference play to 3–0–0.
November 19: With a second period goal versus the Colgate Raiders, Kelly Babstock of the Quinnipiac Bobcats became the program's all-time leading scorer. In just her second season, Babstock surpassed Vicki Graham, who finished with 73 career points, after the 2006–07 season. Babstock reached the milestone in her 50th career game.
November 25: In the first game of the Nutmeg Classic, Erica Uden Johansson scored the game-winning goal as the Bobcats defeated Connecticut by a 4–2 tally.
November 26: Quinnipiac Bobcats player Kelly Babstock led all skaters in points at the 2011 Nutmeg Classic with four (one goal, three assists). With the two assists in the championship game, Babstock earned the 39 and 40 assists of her career, surpassing Caitlin Peters as the all-time assist leader in Bobcats history. Breann Frykas scored the game-winning goal as the Bobcats bested the Robert Morris Colonials by a 3–2 tally. The victory in the Nutmeg Classic was also the 200th career victory of head coach Rick Seeley.
December 15: Head coach Rick Seeley has announced the five members of the Class of 2016. The recruits will join the Bobcats for the 2012–13 season. Defenders Cydney Roesler, Kristen Tamberg, and Lindsey West, will join forwards Nicole Brown and Nicole Connery. All five Bobcats signees played for Team Ontario Red and earned gold medals at the 2011 Canadian National Championships. In addition, Connery and Roesler have previously represented Canada at the Under-18 IIHF World Championships.

Standings

Schedule

Awards and honors
Kelly Babstock, ECAC Player of the Week (Week of November 21, 2011)
Kelly Babstock, Most Valuable Player, 2011 Nutmeg Classic
Nicole Kosta, ECAC Rookie of the Week (Week of February 28, 2012)
Chelsea Laden, ECAC Rookie of the Week (Week of November 28, 2011)
Victoria Vigilanti, ECAC Goaltender of the Week (Week of December 12, 2011)
Victoria Vigilanti, ECAC Goaltender of the Week (Week of February 28, 2012)

Team awards
Kelly Babstock, Most Valuable Player for the second-consecutive season
Rookie of the Year recipient Nicole Kosta
Coaches’ Award recipient, senior Jordan Elkins
Defensive Player of the Year recipient, junior Regan Boulton

References

Quinnipiac Bobcats women's ice hockey seasons
Quinnipiac